Museum of Art of the Parliament of Itapevi 'Emanuel von Lauenstein Massarani' (Museu de Arte do Parlamento de Itapevi 'Emanuel von Lauenstein Massarani'), is a contemporary art museum housed in the Parliament of Itapevi. The Palace is located in Nord-Est of the city.

History 
Founded in August 2019, the museum was named after Emanuel von Lauenstein Massarani, Brazilian journalist, art critic, diplomatic, writer, historian, museologist. The Museum was created for disseminating the cultural heritage of the Municipality of Itapevi. It is managed by the 'Escola do Parlamento de Itapevi, Doutor Osmar de Souza'.

Organization 
The museum collects paintings, sculptures, photographs and prints. The collection include an important contemporary art collection and an 'Outdoor Sculptures Collection' (Esculturas ao Ar Livre). The museum preserves, among others, works by Iwao Nakajima, Joseph Pace, Giuseppe Ranzini, Carlos Araujo.

References

External links
 Official Museum's Website  
 Ato de Constituição do Museu de Arte do Parlamento Itapevi Emanuel von Lauenstein Massarani Constitution Act of the Museum of Art of the Parliament of Itapevi ‘Emanuel von Lauenstein Massarani’

Museums in São Paulo (state)
2019 establishments in Brazil